Jean-François Cuennet (born 1961) from Bulle FR is a Swiss ski mountaineer, long-distance runner and mountain biker. He was coach of the Swiss national ski mountaineering team from 2002 to 2005.

Cuennet competed in mountain running and marathon events in his teens. Before he became national coach, he competed as a member of the Swiss national ski mountaineering team from 1999 to 2001.

Selected results 
 2001:
 1st, Swiss Cup, scratch
 2nd, Trophée des Gastlosen (European Cup, together with Heinz Blatter)
 7th, Pierra Menta (together with Pierre-Marie Taramarcaz)

Patrouille des Glaciers 

 2000: 4th (and 1st in "seniors II" ranking), together with Pius Schuwey and Eric Seydoux
 2008: 6th ("seniors II" class ranking), together with Benoît Jaquet and Christian Pittex
 2010: 4th ("seniors III" class ranking), together with Benoît Jaquet and François Oberson

References 

1961 births
Living people
Swiss male ski mountaineers
Swiss male long-distance runners
Swiss sports coaches
Ski mountaineering coaches
People from Bulle
Sportspeople from the canton of Fribourg